Buddleja jamesonii is a species endemic to southern Ecuador, where it grows in moist, protected ravines and borders of tussocks at elevations of 3,000 – 4,000  m. The species, first named and described by Bentham in 1846, is now threatened by habitat loss. The specific name commemorates the Scottish botanist William Jameson (1796-1873) who collected in Ecuador.

Description
Buddleja jamesonii is a trioecious shrub 0.5 – 1.5 m high with greyish fissured bark at the base. The stems are subquadrangular and lanose, crowded with leaves on short axillary branches. The leaves are sessile, lanceolate and comparatively small,  3 – 4 cm long by 1 – 2 cm wide, lanose on both sides. The cream inflorescence typically comprises just one terminal head, occasionally with a pair of additional sessile heads, each 0.8 – 1.6 cm in diameter, with 15 – 30 flowers. The corolla is 3.5 – 4.5 mm long.

Cultivation
The shrub is not known to be in cultivation.

References

jamesonii
Flora of Ecuador
Flora of South America
Vulnerable plants
Taxonomy articles created by Polbot